Shebalino is a rural locality (a selo) and the administrative center of Shebalinsky Selsoviet, Biysky District, Altai Krai, Russia. The population was 1,105 as of 2013. There are 27 streets.

Geography 
Shebalino is located 49 km ENE of Biysk (the district's administrative centre) by road, on the Bekhtemir River. Bekhtemir-Anikino and Verkh-Bekhtemir are the nearest rural localities.

References 

Rural localities in Biysky District